German submarine U-205 was a Type VIIC U-boat of the Kriegsmarine during World War II. The submarine was laid down on 19 June 1940 by the Friedrich Krupp Germaniawerft yard at Kiel as yard number 634; launched on 20 March 1941; and commissioned on 3 May 1941 under the command of Franz-Georg Reschke.

Design
German Type VIIC submarines were preceded by the shorter Type VIIB submarines. U-205 had a displacement of  when at the surface and  while submerged. She had two shafts and two  propellers.

U-205 was fitted with five  torpedo tubes (four fitted at the bow and one at the stern), fourteen torpedoes, one  SK C/35 naval gun, 220 rounds, and a  C/30 anti-aircraft gun. The boat had a complement of between forty-four and sixty.

Service history
Part of the 3rd U-boat Flotilla, U-205 carried out two patrols in the North Atlantic. Joining 29th U-boat Flotilla, she carried out a further nine patrols in the Mediterranean.

First patrol
U-205s first patrol began when she left Trondheim on 24 July 1941; she travelled through the gap between Greenland and Iceland (the Denmark Strait) and docked at Brest in occupied France, on 23 August 1941.

Second patrol
Leaving Lorient on 23 September 1941, U-205 was attacked and damaged by aircraft on 27 September and returned to port, arriving in Lorient on 2 October 1941.

Third patrol
On 3 November 1941 U-205 left Lorient and joined Wolfpack Arnauld. Breaking through the Gibraltar barrage, U-205 joined the 29th U-Flotilla in La Spezia on 10 December 1941.

Fourth patrol
U-205 left La Spezia on 5 January 1942 and returned on 10 February.

Fifth patrol
Having left La Spezia on 17 March, U-205 reached Salamis on 6 April 1942.

Sixth patrol
Sailing from La Spezia on 6 May 1942, U-205 reached Salamis on 8 June 1942.

Seventh patrol
On the return leg, U-205 successfully attacked the British light cruiser  on 16 June 1942, guarding convoy MW-11 killing the ship's cat 'Convoy' and 87 of his crew-mates. The U-boat docked in La Spezia on 23 June.

Eighth patrol
On 3 August 1942, U-205 sailed from La Spezia for Pula, arriving there on 10 September 1942.

Ninth patrol
Pola, 20 October 1942 – La Spezia, 19 November 1942 and La Spezia, 20 November 1942 – Pola, 24 November 1942

Tenth patrol
Pola, 12 January 1943 – Salamis 26 January 1943

Last patrol and sinking
Leaving Salamis on 2 February 1943, U-205 was manoeuvering to attack a convoy off Apollonia, Cyrenaica on 17 February 1943
Forced to surface by depth charges, U-205s crew abandoned ship after opening the sea vents. A boarding party from HMS Paladin managed to salvage documents and radio equipment. A second warship, attempted to tow the still-floating submarine to the beach, but failed.

Wolfpacks
U-205 took part in one wolfpack, namely:
 Arnauld (5 – 18 November 1941)

Aftermath
U-205 is widely believed to be the submarine with the erroneous number U-307 in Peter Keeble's book Ordeal by Water, in which he describes his dive to recover encrypting equipment from a sunken U-boat.

Summary of raiding history

See also
 Mediterranean U-boat Campaign (World War II)
 Convoy HG 73

References

Bibliography

Jak Mallmann Showell, Enigma U-boats, 2000, p. 95.

External links

World War II submarines of Germany
German Type VIIC submarines
U-boats commissioned in 1941
U-boats sunk in 1943
U-boats sunk by British warships
1941 ships
Ships built in Kiel
World War II shipwrecks in the Mediterranean Sea
Maritime incidents in February 1943